"Into the Night" is a 1980 song by American pop rock singer Benny Mardones from his album Never Run, Never Hide. Inspired by an impoverished family Mardones met during the writing of the album, the lead single would go on to become a two-time top 20 hit, and a signature tune in Mardones' catalogue.

Overview
"Into the Night" is a song that deals in themes of abandonment and aiding, about helping to lift someone out of a tough situation. In an interview with YouTuber Professor of Rock before his passing, Mardones explains the origins of the song date back to the writing process for the Never Run, Never Hide album. He and songwriter Robert Tepper took a trip down to Miami, staying in an apartment while working on songs. He was neighbors with a family in the apartment; a mother, a father who worked in set design, two teen girls, and a teenaged boy. One day, the father walks out on the family, leaving the mother and children destitute. Mardones, wanting to help in any way he could, started paying the teens to tend to odd jobs like walking his dog or picking up groceries at the store. The teen who walked his dog was the middle child, a 16-year-old girl named Heidi. One morning, after having spent most of the night working on the main riff from "Into the Night," Heidi, dressed for school in a rather mature fashion, came up to walk the dog. When Tepper made a stray remark after she left, Mardones shut him down saying "Pal, she's just 16 years old, leave her alone." In a fit of inspiration, Mardones took the line and ran with it, slowly spinning the tale of this family across lyrics such as "It's like having a dream / Where nobody has a heart" highlighting the struggles of the father in set design, and the main chorus being about bringing the family out of poverty.

Mardones went on to cite the song's success and subsequent radio interviews done with Heidi to clear up the controversy as what helped lift the family out of their poverty. Through the exposure, Heidi would meet and ultimately marry the son of a Puerto Rico-based real estate mogul. Heidi's husband brought the family over to Puerto Rico to live with the couple, and gave the brother a job in his company.

In the Professor of Rock interview, Mardones also sheds some light on his powerful vocal performance. The singer cut the lead vocal in three takes, impressing album producer and longtime Styx engineer Barry Mraz. The notorious howling instrumental bridge by Mardones was originally a guide vocal for a saxophonist, but upon completion, Mraz told the singer "We won't be using a saxophone on this record."

The song is unusual for being one of only 10 recordings to ever ascend to the top 20 of the Billboard Hot 100 chart twice.  The chartings, in 1980 and 1989, were of the same recording. Chubby Checker was first to do so with his cover of "The Twist", a single that went to No. 1 in September 1960 and again in January 1962.

"Into the Night" is a track that Mardones re-recorded many times:

The original and best-known 1980 version, which can be found on the album Never Run, Never Hide, duration: 4:32.
The 1989 version, released on Curb Records to capitalize on the renewed success of the original; this version can be found on his self-titled album, duration: 4:22.
The 2002 version, which can be found on the album A Journey Through Time, duration: 4:26.
The 2002 acoustic version, also found on A Journey Through Time, duration: 4:08.
The 2019 version, retitled "Into the Night V3", produced by Joel Diamond, duration: 3:46. A new music video of this song can be found on Diamond's YouTube channel. "Into the Night V3" was also remixed twice, by Dirty Werk and by Eric Kupper. These two versions are more influenced by dance than Mardones's usual soft rock trademark.

Mardones originally released "Into the Night" in June 1980. The song peaked at No. 11 on the Hot 100 for two weeks in September 1980, logging 20 weeks on the chart before falling off in late October. Mardones was unable to duplicate the success of "Into the Night" and is considered a one-hit wonder.

In 1989, a "Where Are They Now?" Arizona radio segment spurred L.A. DJ Scott Shannon to add the song to his playlist, ultimately rocketing the song back onto the national charts, on May 6, 1989.  It peaked this time at No. 20 in the first week in July, adding 17 weeks to its previous run of 20, to add up to a total of 37 (nonconsecutive) weeks.

"Into the Night" was a hit on Adult Contemporary radio this time as well, where it spent 19 weeks and peaked at No. 20.

The original recording was performed in C minor, but shortly before his retirement in 2017, Mardones performed it in B minor to accommodate his aging voice.

Controversy
The controversial opening lyric has led the song to be cited as one of many problematic songs adult men have written and performed about wanting to have sex with teenage girls.

Along with songs like blues standard "Good Morning, Little School Girl", "Young Girl" by Gary Puckett & the Union Gap, "Christine Sixteen" by Kiss, "Seventeen" by Winger and "Jailbait" by Ted Nugent, "Into the Night" has been interpreted as a song that deals in the sexualization of teenage girls in the eyes of adult men. In these songs, where "young girls are deemed appropriate sex objects", men describe fantasies of statutory rape.

The lyrical controversy dates back to the song's release, in which radio stations were originally hesitant to play the song due to the opening line. It wasn't until Mardones' label Polydor sent out a letter explaining the song's origins that stations began playing the song.

Music video
Mardones made a music video for the song, but, as it predated MTV by a year, it was not widely broadcast.

The video opens with Mardones walking down a street and approaching a house. The song plays over the video, and the lyrics serve as Mardones's monologue. He is met at the door by a bearded man who sings the opening line of the song: "She's just 16 years old / Leave her alone." Mardones leaves and walks around to the back of the house, peering through a window at a young girl sitting sullenly in her room. The video then cuts to Mardones at a pay phone, speaking to the girl on the other end of the line and professing his love. The video then cuts again to Mardones returning to the girl's house, carrying a rolled-up carpet. He crawls through her bedroom window, unrolls the magic carpet, and taking the girl's hand, they take flight into the night sky. The video closes with Mardones serenading the girl as they embrace; the scene finally fades to black as they kiss.  

For many years the video was difficult to find in its entirety, although clips were featured in infomercials for Time-Life Soft Rock compilations.

On July 2, 2016, a full version of the video was uploaded to YouTube.

Chart performance

Personnel
1980 Polydor recording
 Benny Mardones – lead vocals, background vocals
 Bobby Messano, Ron Bloom – guitar
 Kinny Landrum – keyboards
 Leigh Foxx – bass
 Sandy Gennaro – drums
 Robert Tepper – background vocals
 Barry Mraz – producer, engineer
 David Gottlieb, Paul Speck – assistant engineers
 Recorded at Quadradial Cinema Recording Studios, North Miami, FL

1989 Curb recording
 Michael Lloyd – producer, engineer
 Benny Mardones – vocals, backing vocals
 Dennis Belfield – bass
 Duane Evans – acoustic piano, clavinet, fender rhodes, synthesizer, backing vocals
 Ron Bloom – guitar
 Ron Krasinski – drums

2019 Silver Blue recording
Benny Mardones – lead vocals
Joel Diamond – producer

2019 Silver Blue remixes
Benny Mardones – lead vocals
Dirty Werk – remixer
Eric Kupper – remixer

Other versions
Nick Kamen covered the song for his 1987 debut album Nick Kamen.

In 1991, reggae singer Junior Tucker had a No. 46 Australian hit with the song, re-titled "16 (Into the Night)".

In 1992, Taiwan's Harlem Yu released a cover version of the song on his album Harlem Music Station.

In 1995, Australian singer Peter Wilson released a cover of the song as a single.

In 1996, the group Fiji included a version of the song on their album Born and Raised.

In 2010, Usher released his own version, "Making Love (Into the Night)" on his album, Raymond v. Raymond.

Sampling
The song was sampled by indie hip hop group Conrad Hilton on the song "Into the Night/Heat of the Night" and Decoy's version of "Into the Night", both of which feature Benny Mardones in the songs.

Rapper Triple J used the melody and interpolated "Into the Night" for his song "16 Years Old".

American band Pure Bathing Culture interpolates part of the melody and refrain of "Into the Night" on their song "Scotty" from the 2013 album Moon Tides.

See also
List of 1980s one-hit wonders in the United States

References

1980 songs
1980 singles
1989 singles
Benny Mardones songs
Polydor Records singles